Glenfield railway station is a junction station serving the Sydney suburb of Glenfield in Australia. It is served by Sydney Trains T8 Airport & South, T2 Inner West & Leppington and T5 Cumberland line services, and by limited NSW TrainLink Southern Highlands Line services.

Configuration
The station lies on the Main South railway line. Five hundred metres north of the station the East Hills line joins, while south of the station the South West Rail Link branches off.

History

The station opened on 6 September 1869, about ten years after the opening of the Main South line. The initial platform was located north of the current station, being relocated to its current position on 27 March 1891. Originally the station consisted of two side platforms.

A junction station
The role of Glenfield changed significantly with the opening of the East Hills to Glenfield extension of the East Hills line on 21 December 1987, which joins the Main South line just north of Glenfield station. The platform buildings were substantially redeveloped at this time.

An additional track was opened to the west of the station in 1995 as part of the Glenfield - Ingleburn passing loop. This unelectrified track was used by freight and long-distance passenger trains. In December 2012, the track was incorporated into the Southern Sydney Freight Line and became freight only.

In 1996, as part of the Y-link works at Granville which created the Cumberland line, Glenfield gained an extra platform (the current platform 1). Platform 1 was created as a side turnback for terminating trains via Liverpool by converting the existing side platform for Central-bound trains into an island platform.

A hub for South West Sydney 

Glenfield station received further redevelopment and expansion as a result of the construction of the South West Rail Link to Leppington. Upgrades in the Glenfield area included the construction includes new car parks, a bus interchange, a new overhead concourse with lifts, a new platform and the replacement of a flat junction between the Main South and East Hills lines with a grade separated junction. A new temporary ticket office was constructed opposite the station in the Magee Lane car park. This served as the ticket office until the construction work at the station was completed. A temporary footbridge provided access to the station after the original eastern entrance was closed. In June 2014, once work was completed, the East Hills line flyover opened, platform 1 became a through platform and platform 4 was brought into service, creating two island platforms.

Construction of the line to Leppington commenced in the second quarter of 2010. This included a flyover just south of Glenfield to take the new line over the existing lines. The line opened on 8 February 2015.

From November 2017, all services from north of Glenfield operate to and from Leppington, with the line between Glenfield and Macarthur served exclusively by services operating via the T8 Airport/Sydenham Line. In recognition of the increased interchange at Glenfield, the works include a minor upgrade to the station that includes extended canopies and new service indicator screens.

Platforms and services

Transport links
Interline Bus Services operate six routes via Glenfield station:
864: to Carnes Hill via Horningsea Park
867: to Prestons
868: to Edmondson Park railway station
870: Campbelltown Hospital to Liverpool station via Harrow Road
871: Campbelltown Hospital to Liverpool station via Leacock Lane
872: Campbelltown Hospital to Liverpool station via Eucalyptus Drive

Glenfield station is served by one NightRide route:
N30: Macarthur station to Town Hall station

References

External links

Glenfield station details Transport for New South Wales

Easy Access railway stations in Sydney
Railway stations in Sydney
Railway stations in Australia opened in 1869
Railway stations in Australia opened in 1891
Main Southern railway line, New South Wales
East Hills railway line
Glenfield, New South Wales